The 2013 Honkbal Hoofdklasse season began on Thursday, April 11. Mampaey The Hawks from Dordrecht competed in the Hoofdklasse for the first time. Sparta/Feyenoord was relegated at the end of the 2012 season but was declared bankrupt by a Rotterdam court on November 22, 2012 and did not compete in the Overgangsklasse.

Standings

References

Honkbal Hoofdklasse
2013 in baseball